Liliana María Martinelli (born May 20, 1970) is a retired female discus thrower from Argentina.

Career

She competed in the discus contest at the 1996 Summer Olympics in Atlanta, Georgia. There she ended up in 35th place (55.68 metres). Martinelli set her personal best in the women's discus throw event (58.24 metres) on April 21, 1996 in Buenos Aires.

International competitions

References

sports-reference

1970 births
Living people
Argentine female discus throwers
Olympic athletes of Argentina
Athletes (track and field) at the 1995 Pan American Games
Athletes (track and field) at the 1996 Summer Olympics
South American Games gold medalists for Argentina
South American Games silver medalists for Argentina
South American Games medalists in athletics
Competitors at the 1990 South American Games
Competitors at the 1994 South American Games
Pan American Games competitors for Argentina
20th-century Argentine women